The women's shot put at the 2018 IAAF World Indoor Championships took place on 2 March 2018.

Summary
No qualifying round was needed, so all entrants were finalists.  In the first round Danniel Thomas-Dodd took the lead with an 18.92m.  Paulina Guba and Gao Yang held the next two positions.  Thomas-Dodd improved slightly in the second round but was displaced by the next thrower, Gong Lijiao with an 18.98m.  Gao also improved with her best of the day 18.77m.  In a vulnerable fifth position after two rounds, Anita Márton saw no challenge to remaining in the competition, then let loose a 19.48m to leapfrog into the lead.  Thomas-Dodd wasn't able to answer that, but as the next to step into the ring, she did throw her best of the day 19.22m, good enough to improve her own Jamaican national record and her hold on silver.  In the final round, Gong threw a 19.08m to solidify her bronze medal position, almost matched by Thomas-Dodd's final effort of 19.07m, but with gold in hand and the pressure off again, Márton threw a new Hungarian national record  to cap off her day.

Márton's gold medal was the first for Hungary in the World Championships.  Thomas-Dodd's was the first medal for a Jamaican woman in the shot put.

Results
The final was started at 20:09.

References

Shot put
Shot put at the World Athletics Indoor Championships